Blaenborthyn is a small village in the  community of Llandysul, Ceredigion, Wales, which is 60.4 miles (97.2 km) from Cardiff and 179.9 miles (289.5 km) from London. Blaenborthyn is represented in the Senedd by Elin Jones (Plaid Cymru) and is part of the Ceredigion constituency in the House of Commons.

Etymology
The name Blaenborthyn is a Welsh name which means "The head of the portal (or way in)". "Borthyn" is also found in the town of Ruthin.

See also
List of localities in Wales by population

References

Villages in Ceredigion
Llandysul